The Summary Jurisdiction Act (Northern Ireland) 1953 (1953 c. 3) is an Act of the Parliament of Northern Ireland that restricted the freedom of the press in relation to court proceedings in Northern Ireland. It prohibited the press from publishing any opening statements, and gave the magistrate discretion to forbid the publishing of any evidence.

References

Bibliography

Acts of the Parliament of Northern Ireland 1953